John Hadley Nicanor Hemingway (October 10, 1923 – December 1, 2000) was a Canadian-American fly fisherman,  conservationist, and writer. He was the son of American novelist and Nobel Prize-laureate Ernest Hemingway.

Early life
Jack Hemingway was born in Toronto, Ontario, Canada, the only child of American writer Ernest Hemingway and his first wife Hadley Richardson. He later gained two half-brothers, Patrick and Gregory/Gloria, from Hemingway's marriage to Pauline Pfeiffer.

Throughout his life, Jack was considered by many to bear a strong physical resemblance to his father, but was more like his mother in temperament: "good-natured and even-tempered, and not particularly driven". He was named for his mother, and for the Spanish matador Nicanor Villalta y Serrés, whom his father admired. Gertrude Stein and Alice B. Toklas were his godparents. Nicknamed Bumby as a toddler by his mother "because of his plump teddy-bear qualities", he spent his early years in Paris and the Austrian Alps.

College, military service, early post-war career
Hemingway attended the University of Montana and Dartmouth College, but never graduated, instead enlisting in the U.S. Army after the attack on Pearl Harbor in 1941. Known for his sense of humor, in late 1943 at Camp Shanks near Orangeburg, New York, he overheard two older men (one of whom he recognized) in a bar arguing over who was the better writer, Ernest Hemingway or William Faulkner. Jack interrupted, and said in his opinion, there was "a writer that was a better storyteller than either Hemingway or Faulkner – Maurice Walsh". One of the men said, "'I am Maurice Walsh," to which Hemingway responded, "I'm Jack Hemingway ... pleased to meet you."

Assigned overseas to France in 1944, he started as a military police officer commanding a special unit of black soldiers, and later obtained a transfer into the Office of Strategic Services (OSS), the newly formed U.S. wartime intelligence agency that evolved into the CIA after the war. As a French-speaking First Lieutenant with the OSS, he worked with the French Resistance. Characteristic of his sense of daring, he parachuted into occupied France with his fly rod, reel and flies, and was almost captured by a German patrol while fishing after his first mission. While on a leave in Algiers, he met with his father's third wife, Martha Gellhorn, whom Jack called his "favorite other mother", who was on her way to Italy to work as a war correspondent with the French Forces.

In France in late October 1944, Hemingway was wounded and captured by the Germans behind enemy lines in the Vosges, and was held as a POW (prisoner-of-war) at Moosburg Prison Camp until April 1945. Upon his release, he was flown to Paris in time to join the crowds celebrating VE-Day on May 8, 1945, in the Champs Elysees so beloved by his parents, and he was awarded the Croix de Guerre by the government of France for his wartime service.

After the war, he was stationed briefly in West Berlin and Freiburg im Breisgau in Germany, and at Fort Bragg, North Carolina, before leaving the army. After his discharge, and back in civilian life, he worked as a stockbroker, and then as a fishing supplies salesman. In 1967, he retired and returned to live in Ketchum, Idaho, his father's last home and burial place. There he taught languages, pursued his passion for fly fishing, and wrote two autobiographical books.

Marriage and family
Hemingway married Byra Louise "Puck" Whittlesey on June 25, 1949, in Paris. Their wedding was attended by Julia Child and Alice B. Toklas. The couple had three children: Joan Whittlesey "Muffet" Hemingway (born 1950), Margot Louise Hemingway later known as Margaux Hemingway (1954–1996), and Mariel Hadley Hemingway (born 1961). 
 
Puck died of cancer in 1988. In 1989, Hemingway married Angela Holvey; they remained married until his death in 2000.

Sexual abuse allegations 
In the 1990s, Margaux accused her father of molesting her as a child, an allegation he denied. She later died of a barbiturate overdose in 1996 at age 42; her death was ruled self-inflicted, thereby becoming "the fifth person in four generations of her family to commit suicide". In a 2013 television documentary film Running from Crazy, Mariel spoke of her family's struggles with alcoholism, mental illness, and suicide.
She also backed up her sister's allegation of being molested by Jack, claiming that he sexually abused both of her two older sisters in childhood.

Angler and conservationist
Throughout his life, Jack Hemingway was an avid fly fisherman. He fished "most of North America's great trout streams", and several of the world's best salmon rivers, such as the Lærdalselvi River in Norway.

A long-time resident of Idaho, Hemingway lived in Ketchum, Idaho. From 1971 to 1977, he was a commissioner on the Idaho Fish and Game Commission. Idaho's trout stocks increased as a result of Hemingway's success in getting the state to adopt a catch and release fishing law. His work with The Nature Conservancy was instrumental in preserving Silver Creek near Sun Valley, Idaho as one of Idaho's premier trout streams.

Writer
Jack Hemingway assisted his father's fourth wife and widow, Mary Welsh Hemingway, with final editing before publication of A Moveable Feast (1964), his father's memoir of life in 1920s Paris, which was published three years after Ernest Hemingway's death.

Jack Hemingway also published an autobiography, Misadventures of a Fly Fisherman: My Life With and Without Papa, in 1986. A second autobiographical work, A Life Worth Living: The Adventures of a Passionate Sportsman, was released posthumously in 2002.

Death and honors
Jack Hemingway died on December 1, 2000, at age 77 from complications following heart surgery in New York City. He had previously suffered a heart attack at around age 44. In 2001, the state of Idaho designated an annual "Jack Hemingway Conservation Day" in his honor. He is buried in Idaho at the Ketchum Cemetery, next to his wife Puck, daughter Margaux, father Ernest, step-mother Mary and half-brother Gregory.

Writings
Hemingway, Jack (1986). Misadventures of a Fly Fisherman: My Life With and Without Papa. Dallas: Taylor Pub. Co.  
Hemingway, Jack (2002). A Life Worth Living: The Adventures of a Passionate Sportsman. Guilford, Conn.: Lyons Press.

Notes

References

Sources

Oliver, Charles M. (1999). Ernest Hemingway A to Z: The Essential Reference to the Life and Work. New York: Checkmark Publishing.

External links

"Obituary: Jack Hemingway" from The Guardian
Last Interview, at sunvalleyguide.com.

American conservationists
American fishers
Sportspeople from Idaho
Writers from Idaho
Canadian people of American descent
Canadian people of English descent
Canadian emigrants to the United States
Canadian expatriates in Austria
Canadian expatriates in France
American prisoners of war in World War II
Sportspeople from Toronto
Writers from Toronto
Burials in Idaho
Canadian autobiographers
Canadian book editors
Hemingway family
1923 births
2000 deaths
People from Ketchum, Idaho
United States Army personnel of World War II
United States Army officers
World War II prisoners of war held by Germany
People of the Office of Strategic Services
American military police officers
Storm King School alumni